The Omeo and District Football League (ODFL) is an Australian rules football League based on the Omeo
Region of East Gippsland, Victoria, Australia. The ODFL has existed in some form since 1893, and operates under the auspices of the Victorian Country Football League (VCFL). The league is situated in an area with a small population, resulting in the league playing 16-a-side rather than the standard 18-a-side, and not fielding a reserve grade.

Clubs involved in the ODFL are invited to field a men's senior football team and boys' junior (Under 16) football team, with girls up to 13 also being able to play in the junior football team. Clubs can also compete in a concurrent netball league, with women's senior netball teams at A and B levels, and girls' junior 17-and-under and 12-and-under netball teams; boys are permitted to compete in the netball teams up to 13 years of age.

History
The first recorded football competition in the upper Tambo Valley region, often referred to as the Omeo District, dates back to 1893. Other than short recesses resulting from the two World Wars, some type of official competition has continued uninterrupted from this time. In 1923 the competition was renamed the Omeo District Football League (ODFL), and it has continued with this name until the present day.

Throughout most of its history the ODFL and its precedents has contained teams from the four main towns of the Omeo District, namely Benambra, Ensay, Omeo, and Swifts Creek. Up until around World War I, when the population of the region was significantly higher due to the lingering effects of the gold rushes, a team from the now minor locality of Cassilis (originally known as Long Gully) was also involved in most seasons and experienced considerable success. Records indicate other historical localities from the district also occasionally fielded teams, including Bindi, Glen Wills, Little River, Reedy Creek, and Tambo Crossing. Since 1893 Omeo, or its later incarnation as the merged Omeo-Benambra team, has competed in all but possibly two seasons, while Swifts Creek has never missed a season, making it one of the oldest continuously operating Australian Rules Football or general sporting clubs in the country.

The league was named for Omeo, the largest town and traditionally the administrative centre of the region. The area was commonly referred to as the Omeo District, and existed as the independent local government Shire of Omeo, or Omeo Shire, until it was amalgamated with several other shires into the newly formed Shire of East Gippsland in 1994.

In historical times the region was relatively isolated, with the remote 52 km section of the Omeo Highway (now the Great Alpine Road) between Ensay and Bruthen mainly unsealed and regularly impassable, especially during the winter months. This made the road slow to navigate, especially before readily available motorised transport became common. This was the reason for the historical governmental separation of the region despite its low population, and explained the need for the small isolated football league.

Boyle and Mac's Challenge Cup (1893–96)
The earliest recorded history of a football competition in the Omeo District was the Boyle and Mac's Challenge Cup, referred to alternatively as the Boyle and Mac Cup, Boyle Mac Challenge Cup, or Boyle Mac trophy.  This competition began in 1893, four years before the formation of the Victorian Football League (now Australian Football League), the premier football league in Victoria and Australia. It is unknown exactly why the competition had the Boyle and Mac's title, however the captain of Omeo was named Boyle.

Records indicate that the 1893 trophy was awarded following a series of games between Long Gully, Omeo, and Swifts Creek Football Clubs, with each club playing the others two times for a total of six matches. A newspaper report from early in the season suggests a final match was scheduled, presumably between the top two sides, however the same paper reported at the end of the season that the winner of the cup was decided on the top placed team at the end of the six matches, with no actual final being played.

Swifts Creek defeated Omeo in the final match of the season, placing them two points clear at the top of the ladder with two wins and a draw (for ten points), from Omeo with two wins (eight points), and Long Gully with one win and a draw (six points). The 1893 trophy is engraved on the front with: BOYLE & MAC'SCHALLENGE CUPWon bySWIFT'S CREEK1893 with a separate engraving on the back presenting the trophy to the club's secretary. The Boyle and Mac's Challenge Cup ran from 1893 until 1896.

Noble Explosives Cup (1897–98)
Following the 1896 season the Boyle and Mac's Challenge Cup was disbanded, being replaced with the Noble Explosives Cup. This competition only ran for two seasons, 1897 and 1898, with its two premiers being Omeo and Cassilis.

Omeo District Football Association (ODFA) (1899–1907, 1914–21)

The Omeo District Football Association (ODFA) was formed in 1899, replacing the Noble Explosives Cup. The competition ran under this name from 1899 to 1907, then from 1914 to 1921. Clubs that competed in the ODFA over this time were Cassilis, Omeo, Benambra, Swifts Creek, and Ensay, although only Omeo played in every season that the ODFA was operational. After a year's absence in 1922, the competition would relaunch in 1923 as the Omeo District Football League. Further discussion is included below on the interaction between the ODFA and the Tambo Valley Football Association during their overlapping years of operation between 1907 and 1921.

Tambo Valley Football Association (TVFA) (1907–25)
The mainstays of the early football competitions up to the ODFA were Swifts Creek and Omeo, with Long Gully/Cassilis, Benambra, and Ensay also fielding teams in some or most years. In 1907 the competition split into two branches. The ODFA continued as an 'above the gap' competition involving Omeo, Benambra, and Cassilis, while a new 'below the gap' competition, the Tambo Valley Football Association (TVFA), was formed by Swifts Creek, Ensay, and a new team from the small locality at Bindi. At this time roads were poor and transport options limited, making the 70 km between Benambra and Ensay for example very significant, so presumably this split was largely to help with travel as the competition expanded to more clubs over a larger area.

In 1908, after just one year of the split competition, the ODFA temporarily folded, leaving the TVFA as the only competition in the district. In 1909 the short-lived Bindi club was discontinued, and after a year's hiatus Omeo and Cassilis joined Swifts Creek and Ensay in the TVFA competition, taking it back to four of the regular teams from the previous ODFA. Benambra did not field a team again until 1914 when the TVFA/ODFA split was again implemented. For this split competition in 1914 Bindi temporarily reformed to make up numbers in the TVFA, and the dominant Swifts Creek club which had won the last six straight premierships fielded a one-time only second team, Swifts Creek A, which would lead to the unusual situation of Swifts Creek A defeating Swifts Creek in the 1914 TVFA Grand Final.

After just one year of this re-split competition, World War I would then cause both competitions to enter recess from 1915 to 1918. Following the war in 1919 both competitions again recommenced, but Swifts Creek now returned to the ODFA along with Omeo, Benambra, and Cassilis in their last season. The TVFA meanwhile would consist of Ensay and two nearby minor localities, Reedy Creek and Little River. At the end of 1921 the ODFA wound up for the last time, and Omeo and Swifts Creek rejoined Ensay in the TVFA for the 1922 season. The commencement of the rebranded ODFL in 1923 would see Omeo and Swifts Creek again leave the TVFA to take part in that competition, with the TVFA having its last season in 1925 with Ensay, Reedy Creek, and a once only team from Tambo Crossing. After this Ensay would again join Benambra, Omeo, and Swifts Creek in the new ODFL.

Omeo District Football League (ODFL)/Omeo District Football Netball League (ODFNL) (1923–present)
In 1923 the Omeo District Football League (ODFL) was formed to replace the ODFA, and has continued with that name ever since. Following the termination of the TVFA after the 1925 season, the ODFL competition ran for more than fifty years with a stable four club structure involving the four main Tambo Valley/Omeo District towns, Benambra, Ensay, Omeo, and Swifts Creek.

In 1978 the league first expanded beyond its traditional range, with Bruthen and Buchan being admitted. Following on from this the competition later became more often referred to as the Omeo and District Football League (still abbreviated to ODFL), with the "and" recognising that it now incorporated teams from beyond the original Omeo District. In 1995 one of the four traditional clubs, Ensay, folded due a lack of players. In 1997 the league admitted two more new clubs from beyond its original range, Swan Reach and Lake Tyers. Lake Tyers would only play for two seasons, but in 2004 another outside team, Lindenow South was also admitted.

By the 2000s many clubs were struggling to find sufficient players every week, and the two historic 'above the gap' teams, Benambra and Omeo, would make the difficult decision to merge and form Omeo-Benambra from the 2007 season onwards. By this era most of the football teams in the competition had also already fully affiliated with their associated netball teams, and the competition eventually officially adopted the title of Omeo District Football Netball League (ODFNL).

Key events in competition history
Note: unless otherwise stated, all items refer to senior football teams. Netball and junior teams often, but not always, follow the senior football teams. There are also insufficient available data sources relating to netball and juniors, including when the competitions originated.
 1893: The first recorded football competition in the Omeo District, the Boyle and Mac's Challenge Cup was formed, consisting of Long Gully (Cassilis), Omeo, and Swifts Creek. Swifts Creek won the first 'cup'.
 1895: Benambra joined the competition.
 1897: The Noble Explosives Cup replaced the Boyle and Mac's Challenge Cup, which had been disbanded after the 1896 season.
 1899: After just two years the Noble Explosives Cup was disbanded, being replaced by the Omeo District Football Association (ODFA).
 1900: Ensay is thought to have joined the competition.
 1907: The competition split into the ODFA and the Tambo Valley Football Association (TVFA). 
 1908–13: The TVFA was the only active competition after the ODTA ceased to operate. 
 1914: The ODFA reformed, again resulting in a split competition. 
 1915–18: Both the ODFA and TVFA were in recess due to the large number of young men from the district involved in World War I.
 1919: Both the ODFA and TVFA recommenced competition. Founding club Cassilis (originally Long Gully) played their last season. 
 1921: Last season of the ODFA, again leaving only the TVFA operational. 
 1923: The Omeo District Football League (ODFL) was formed.
 1925: Last season of the TVFA.
 1926: Ensay from the TVFA joined Benambra, Omeo, and Swifts Creek to form the stable four team ODFL, which would persist for the next 52 years.
 1941–44: The league was in recess due to the large number of young men from the district involved in World War II.
 1978: Bruthen (from the East Gippsland Football League) and Buchan (after an eight-year recess from the Snow Valley Football League) were admitted, extending the league beyond the traditional 'Omeo District' of the upper Tambo Valley for the first time, and taking the number of teams to six. 
 1995: Ensay's last season. In Round 4 Benambra scored 52.24.342 against them. Ensay folded after Round 5 due to being unable to field a team. Ensay's record for the season was expunged.
 1996: Lake Tyers reformed after many years in recess, affiliating with the ODFL for the first time, and competing in 1996–97, returning the league to six teams. 
 1997: Swan Reach were admitted from the Riviera Football League after spending a year in recess, making a seven team competition.
 1997: Lake Tyers were ejected from the league following conflicts with other clubs, after having made the 1997 Grand Final, returning the league to six teams.
 2000s: Most towns fully affiliated their long associated football and netball clubs, and the league officially adopted the title Omeo District Football Netball League (ODFNL).
 2004: Lindenow South were admitted after the Riviera Football League folded, making seven teams, and introducing a bye.
 2007: Benambra and Omeo merged to form Omeo-Benambra, returning the league to six teams.
 c2010: Competition rules were modified to allow girls up to 13 to play junior boys' football, and boys up to 13 to play junior girls' netball.
 2010s: A second "B" grade netball competition was implemented to allow more women to take part.
 2020: The season was cancelled for the first time in 75 years due to the COVID-19 pandemic, which was particularly bad in Victoria during the second half of the year.
 2021: After several interruptions throughout the year, the season was officially abandoned after the first week of finals due to the COVID-19 pandemic. The remaining three teams in Senior Football were Lindenow South, Swifts Creek, and Omeo-Benambra.

Clubs
Note that details given in this section refer to senior football teams. In terms of colours and jumper designs, junior football teams generally follow the same design as senior teams. Netball teams share much the same colour combination, typically with a skirt of one of the primary team colours and a top of the other colour. Years in the league for other teams are also mainly in line with the club's senior football, although clubs are not always able to field all teams in any given year.

Current

* Note that the jumper design shown is a representation of the club's most recent jumper design. Most designs have been changed over the years, some quite significantly.

Previous

* Note that the jumper design shown is a representation of the club's final known jumper design. Where the design is unknown, a representation of the club colours, if known, is displayed instead.

Premierships

Senior football

As ODFL/ODFNL

Pre-ODFL

* Key: BMC – Boyle and Mac's Challenge Cup; NEC – Noble Explosives Cup; ODFA – Omeo District Football Association; TVFA – Tambo Valley Football Association.

Junior football (Under 16)
Junior football is open to all boys under sixteen years of age on the first of January each year. Due to the low population and the number of players needed for football teams this is the only junior competition available, raising the unusual challenge that teenagers as old as sixteen may be playing against children as young as six. During the 2000s rules were modified to allow girls up to the age of 13 years to also take part in this competition.

Senior netball

The senior netball competition is for women and older teenage girls. Records for the netball competitions are harder to obtain and less complete than for football, so it is unclear exactly when the netball competitions commenced. Some photographic records from the early 1950s show women's basketball teams, so it may have begun post-World War II. When the basketball competitions transferred to netball is also unclear. A single competition ran until the 2010s, when a second "B" grade was added due to demand for more women to participate. The original single team was then renamed as "A" grade. Clubs have gradually added a second side so that as of 2022 all clubs fielded both A and B grade teams, however, often some players will be required to play in both teams to fill numbers, or junior players will be used to make up sides.

"A" Grade

"B" Grade

Junior netball (17-and-under)
Junior netball is open to all female players seventeen years of age and under as of the first of January each year. Prior to 2019 it was an Under 16 competition, open to girls under sixteen years of age as of the first of January. While potentially any juniors can play in these teams, in practical terms girls under twelve will generally only play in the 12-and-under team. Junior boys 13 years and under may also participate in the netball teams.

12-and-under netball
Junior 12-and-under netball (formerly 'Midget netball') is open to players twelve years of age and under as of the first of January of the current year; while it is primarily a female sport, boys may also compete. Prior to 2019 it was open to players attending primary school, effectively making it approximately an under eleven competition. Finals are not played in 12 and under netball; the team that finishes at the top of the ladder at the end of the regular season is regarded as the premier team.

* Although the 2021 season finals were abandoned for all other groups due to Covid-19, as 12-&-under do not play finals, a premier was still able to be declared.

Senior football final ladders

2010 Ladder

2011 Ladder

2012 Ladder

2013 Ladder

2014 Ladder 

 Buchan were disqualified for playing an ineligible player

2015 Ladder

References

External links
League website
Full Points Footy – Omeo & District Football League

Netball leagues in Victoria (Australia)
Australian rules football competitions in Victoria (Australia)
East Gippsland